1 Chronicles 10 is the tenth chapter of the Books of Chronicles in the Hebrew Bible or the First Book of Chronicles in the Old Testament of the Christian Bible. The book is compiled from older sources by an unknown person or group, designated by modern scholars as "the Chronicler", and had the final shape established in late fifth or fourth century BCE. This chapter describes Saul's downfall and the reasons of his rejection by God. The whole chapter belongs to the section focusing on the kingship of David (1 Chronicles 9:35 to 29:30).

Text
This chapter was originally written in the Hebrew language. It is divided into 14 verses.

Textual witnesses
Some early manuscripts containing the text of this chapter in Hebrew are of the Masoretic Text tradition, which includes the Aleppo Codex (10th century), and Codex Leningradensis (1008).

There is also a translation into Koine Greek known as the Septuagint, made in the last few centuries BCE. Extant ancient manuscripts of the Septuagint version include Codex Vaticanus (B; B; 4th century), Codex Sinaiticus (S; BHK: S; 4th century), Codex Alexandrinus (A; A; 5th century) and Codex Marchalianus (Q; Q; 6th century).

Old Testament references
: .

Death of Saul and his sons (10:1–10)
This section marks the change of form in the Books of Chronicles changes from a list-based text to a more narrative description based on the historical documents such as the books of Samuel and books of Kings, and additional materials to provide information on the legitimate Davidic kingdom. It begins with Saul's downfall to theologically link the whole exposition with the Babylonian Exile at the end.

Verse 6
So Saul died, and his three sons, and all his house died together.
Cross reference: 

Verse 10
And they put his armour in the house of their gods, and fastened his head in the temple of Dagon.
Cross reference: 
According to  Saul's armour was placed in the temple of Ashtaroth (Astarte) and his body fastened to the walls of Beth-shan. The Chronicler avoids naming foreign gods, with few exception, such as Dagon.
"Dagon": god of grain, one of principal deities of the Philistines. The statue of Dagon lost its head and hands when the Philistines placed the ark of YHWH in a temple of Dagon. The fate of Saul was also similar to that of Goliath (1 Samuel 17).

Burial of Saul (10:11–14)

The Chronicler focuses more on Saul's rejection by God, giving no less than four reasons: 
 Saul's transgression (NKJV/NRSV: 'unfaithfulness'): denoting religious crimes which lead to defeat and exile.
 He did not keep the word of God, a judgement as declared in Deuteronomy and Psalm 119, for instance.
 He consulted a medium, an accusation which contains a pun as "Saul" and "consult" ("enquire, inquire, ask";) are made up of the same consonants in Hebrew. This refers to Saul's visit to the witch of Endor (1 Samuel 28).
 He did not seek the Lord, emphasizing the Chronicler's general attitude towards God.

Verse 12
all the valiant men arose and took away the body of Saul and the bodies of his sons, and brought them to Jabesh. And they buried their bones under the oak in Jabesh and fasted seven days.
Cross reference: 1 Samuel 31:12–13
The brave action of the men, marching from Jabesh-Gilead to Beth-Shan and back (about  one way), recalls the high point of Saul's leadership at the beginning of his reign when he saved the people of Jabesh-Gilead from foreign attacks (1 Samuel 11).

Verse 14
But he did not inquire of the Lord; therefore He killed him, and turned the kingdom over to David the son of Jesse.
"Turned the kingdom over": The kingdom of Israel is 'at God's disposal', so the choice of kings belongs to God (cf.).

See also

Related Bible parts: 1 Samuel 11, 1 Samuel 13, 1 Samuel 14, 1 Samuel 15, 1 Samuel 28, 1 Samuel 31, 2 Samuel 1, 1 Chronicles 28, 1 Chronicles 29

References

Sources

External links
 Jewish translations:
 Divrei Hayamim I - I Chronicles - Chapter 10 (Judaica Press) translation [with Rashi's commentary] at Chabad.org
 Christian translations:
 Online Bible at GospelHall.org (ESV, KJV, Darby, American Standard Version, Bible in Basic English)
 First Book of Chronicles Chapter 10. Bible Gateway

10
Dagon